Harold Allison Terris (December 11, 1916 – April 22, 2001) was a military pilot, civil servant, and politician in the province of New Brunswick, Canada.

Terris was born in Hillsborough, New Brunswick in 1916. During World War II, Harold Terris served overseas as a Spitfire pilot with the Royal Canadian Air Force. After the War, he worked as a civil servant for the province of New Brunswick. In 1987 he was the successful Liberal Party candidate for the riding of  Albert, defeating incumbent Malcolm MacLeod. Terris chose not to seek reelection in 1991.

He married Arleen M. Betts (1921–2008) of Doaktown, New Brunswick. The couple had a daughter, Susan, and a son, James.

References

 Legislative Assembly of New Brunswick

2001 deaths
20th-century Canadian civil servants
New Brunswick Liberal Association MLAs
Canadian World War II pilots
Canadian Baptists
People from Albert County, New Brunswick
1916 births
20th-century Baptists